The Inter-Italian Soccer Club, also known as Cleveland Inter, was a soccer team based in Cleveland.

History

Founded in 1957, the club was a National Amateur Cup finalist in 1971, losing the final for St. Louis Kutis S.C. In 1973, the club was the 1973 National Challenge Cup's runner-up.

Honors
National Challenge Cup
Runner-up (1): 1973
National Amateur Cup
Runner-up (1): 1971

References

Defunct soccer clubs in Ohio
Association football clubs established in 1957